(Geoffrey) Bryan Bentley (16 July 1909 – 12 September 1996) was a Canon of Windsor from 1957 to 1982

Career

He was educated at King's College, Cambridge.

He was appointed:
Assistant Curate, St Cuthbert's, Copnor 1933 - 1935
Tutor of Scholae Cancellarii, Lincoln 1935 -1938
Lecturer 1938 - 1952
Priest Vicar, Lincoln Cathedral 1938 - 1952
Proctor in Convocation 1945 - 1955
Rector, Milton Abbot with Dunteron 1952 - 1957
Examining Chaplain to the Bishop of Exeter 1952 - 1974;

He was appointed to the eleventh stall in St George's Chapel, Windsor Castle, in 1957, and held the stall until 1982.

References 

1909 births
1996 deaths
Alumni of King's College, Cambridge
Canons of Windsor